The 2015 Sarasota Open was a professional tennis tournament played on clay courts. It was the 7th edition of the tournament which was part of the 2015 ATP Challenger Tour. It took place in Sarasota, Florida, United States between 11 and 19 April.

Singles main-draw entrants

Seeds

 1 Rankings are as of April 6, 2015

Other entrants
The following players received wildcards into the singles main draw:
  Tim Smyczek
  Michael Mmoh
  Mitchell Krueger
  Dennis Novikov

The following players received entry into the singles main draw as alternates:
  Liam Broady
  James McGee

The following players received entry from the qualifying draw:
  Frances Tiafoe
  Mischa Zverev
  Renzo Olivo
  Rogério Dutra Silva

The following player received entry into the singles main draw as a lucky loser:
  Michael Russell

Champions

Singles

 Federico Delbonis def.  Facundo Bagnis, 6–4, 6–2

Doubles

 Facundo Argüello /  Facundo Bagnis def.  Chung Hyeon /  Divij Sharan, 3–6, 6–2, [13–11]

References
 Singles Main Draw

External links
Official Website

Sarasota Open
Sarasota Open
2015 in American tennis
2015 in sports in Florida